The term "National Treasure" has been used in Japan to denote cultural properties since 1897,
although the definition and the criteria have changed since the introduction of the term. The written materials in the list adhere to the current definition, and have been designated National Treasures according to the Law for the Protection of Cultural Properties that came into effect on June 9, 1951. The items are selected by the Ministry of Education, Culture, Sports, Science and Technology based on their "especially high historical or artistic value".

Writing was introduced from Korea to Japan around 400 AD (in the form of Chinese books), with work done in Chinese by immigrant scribes from the mainland. Literacy remained at an extremely marginal level in the 5th and 6th centuries, but during the 7th century a small number of Japanese scholar-aristocrats such as Prince Shōtoku began to write in Chinese for official purposes and in order to promote Buddhism. By the late 7th century, reading and writing had become an integral part of life of some sections of the ruling and intellectual classes, particularly in government and religion. The earliest extant large-scale works compiled in Japan are the historical chronicles Kojiki (712) and Nihon Shoki (720). Other early Japanese works from the Nara period include biographies of Prince Shōtoku, cultural and geographical records (fudoki) and the Man'yōshū, the first anthology of Japanese poetry. Necessarily all of these works were either written in Chinese or in a hybrid Japanese-Chinese style and were modeled on Chinese prototypes. The development of a distinct Japanese script (kana) in the 9th century was the starting point of the classical age of Japanese literature and led to a number of new, uniquely Japanese genres of literature, such as tales (monogatari) or diaries (nikki). Because of the strong interest and support in literature of the Heian court, writing activities flourished particularly in the 10th and 11th centuries.

This list contains books of various type that have been compiled in Classical and early Feudal Japan. More than half of the 70 designated treasures are works of poetry and prose. Another large segment consists of historical works such as manuscripts of the Kojiki and Nihon Shoki; the rest are books of various type such as dictionaries, law books, biographies or music scores. The designated manuscripts date from 9th century Heian period to the Edo period with most dating to the Heian period. They are housed in temples, museums, libraries or archives, universities and in private collections.

The objects in this list represent about one third of the 232 National Treasures in the category "writings". They are complemented by 57 Chinese book National Treasures and 105 other written National Treasures.

Statistics

Usage
The table's columns (except for Remarks and Image) are sortable by pressing the arrows symbols. The following gives an overview of what is included in the table and how the sorting works.
Name: the name as registered in the Database of National Cultural Properties
Authors: name of the author(s)
Remarks: information about the type of document and its content
Date: period and year; the column entries sort by year. If only a period is known, they sort by the start year of that period.
Format: principal type, technique and dimensions; the column entries sort by the main type: scroll (includes handscrolls and letters), books (includes albums, ordinary bound books and books bound by fukuro-toji) and other (includes hanging scrolls)
Present location: "temple/museum/shrine-name town-name prefecture-name"; the column entries sort as "prefecture-name town-name".
Image: picture of the manuscript or of a characteristic document in a group of manuscripts

Treasures

Japanese literature
The adaption of the Chinese script, introduced in Japan in the 5th or 6th century, followed by the 9th century development of a script more suitable to write in the Japanese language, is reflected in ancient and classical Japanese literature from the 7th to 13th century. This process also caused unique genres of Japanese literature to evolve from earlier works modelled on Chinese prototypes. The earliest traces of Japanese literature date to the 7th century and consist of Japanese verse (waka) and poetry written in Chinese by Japanese poets (kanshi). While the latter showed little literary merit compared to the large volume of poems composed in China, waka poetry made great progress in the Nara period culminating in the Man'yōshū, an anthology of more than 4,000 pieces of mainly tanka ("short poem") from the period up to the mid-8th century. Until the 9th century, Japanese language texts were written in Chinese characters via the man'yōgana writing system, generally using the phonetic value of the characters. Since longer passages written in this system became unmanageably long, man'yōgana was used mainly for poetry while classical Chinese was reserved for prose. Consequently, the prose passages in the Man'yōshū are in Chinese and the Kojiki (712), the oldest extant chronicle, uses man'yōgana only for the songs and poems.

A revolutionary achievement was the development of kana, a true Japanese script, in the mid to late 9th century. This new script enabled Japanese authors to write more easily in their own language and led to a variety of vernacular prose literature in the 10th century such as tales (monogatari) and poetic journals (nikki). Japanese waka poetry and Japanese prose reached their highest developments around the 10th century, supported by the general revival of traditional values and the high status ascribed to literature by the Heian court. The Heian period (794 to 1185) is therefore generally referred to as the classical age of Japanese literature. Being the language of scholarship, government and religion, Chinese was still practiced by the male nobility of the 10th century while for the most part aristocratic women wrote diaries, memoirs, poetry and fiction in the new script. The Tale of Genji written in the early 11th century by a noblewoman (Murasaki Shikibu) is according to Helen Craig McCullough the "single most impressive accomplishment of Heian civilization".

Another literary genre called setsuwa ("informative narration") goes back to orally transmitted myths, legends, folktales, and anecdotes. Setsuwa comprise the oldest Japanese tales, were originally Buddhist influenced, and were meant to be educational. The oldest setsuwa collection is the Nihon Ryōiki (early 9th century). With a widening religious and social interest of the aristocracy, setsuwa collections were compiled again in the late 11th century starting with the Konjaku Monogatarishū The high quality of the Tale of Genji influenced the literature into the 11th and 12th centuries. A large number of monogatari and some of the best poetic treatises were written in the early Kamakura period (around 1200).

Waka
Waka ("Japanese poem") or uta ("song") is an important genre of Japanese literature. The term originated in the Heian period to distinguish Japanese-language poetry from kanshi, poetry written in Chinese by Japanese authors. Waka began as an oral tradition, in tales, festivals and rituals, and began to be written in the 7th century. In the Asuka and Nara periods, "waka" included a number of poetic forms such as tanka ("short poems"), chōka ("long poems"), bussokusekika, sedōka ("memorized poem") and katauta ("poem fragment"), but by the 10th century only the 31-syllable tanka survived. The Man'yōshū, of the mid-8th century, is the primary record of early Japanese poetry and the first waka anthology. It contains the three main forms of poetry at time of compilation: 4,200 tanka, 260 chōka and 60 sedōka; dating from 759 backwards more than one century.

The early 9th century, however, was a period of direct imitation of Chinese models making kanshi the major form of poetry at the time. In the late 9th century, waka and the development of kana script rose simultaneously with the general revival of traditional values, culminating in the compilation of the first imperial waka anthology, the Kokinshū, in 905. It was followed in 951 by the Gosen Wakashū; in all seven imperial anthologies were compiled in the Heian period. The main poetic subjects were love and the four seasons; the standards of vocabulary, grammar and style, established in the Kokinshū, dominated waka composition into the 19th century.

For aristocrats to succeed in private and public life during the Heian period, it was essential to be fluent in the composition and appreciation of waka, as well as having thorough knowledge of and ability in music, and calligraphy. Poetry was used in witty conversations, in notes of invitation, thanks or condolence, and for correspondence between friends and lovers. Some of the finest poetry of the Heian period came from the middle-class court society such as ladies in waiting or middle-rank officials. Uta-awase poetry contests, in which poets composed poetry on a given theme to be judged by an individual, were held from 885 onwards, and became a regular activity for Heian courtiers from the 10th century onward. Contest judgments led to works about waka theory and critical studies. Poems from the contents were added to imperial anthologies. Critical theories, and the poems in the anthologies (particularly the Kokinshū), became the basis for judgments in the contests. Utaawase continued to be held through the late-11th century, as social rather than literary events. Held in opulence in a spirit of friendly rivalry, they included chanters, scribes, consultants, musicians, and an audience. During the Heian period, waka were often collected in large anthologies, such as the Man'yōshū or Kokinshū, or smaller private collections of the works of a single poet. Waka also featured highly in all kinds of literary prose works including monogatari, diaries and historical works. The Tale of Genji alone contains 800 waka.

At the end of the Heian period, the aristocracy lost political and economical power to warrior clans, but retained the prestige as custodians of high culture and literature. Nostalgia for the Heian court past, considered then as classical Japanese past (as opposed to Chinese past), created a renaissance in the arts and led to a blossoming of waka in the early Kamakura period. Poets of middle and lower rank, such as Fujiwara no Shunzei, Saigyō Hōshi and Fujiwara no Teika, analyzed earlier works, wrote critical commentaries, and added new aesthetic values such as yūgen to waka poetry. Some of the best imperial anthologies and best poetic anthologies, such as Shunzei's Korai fūteishō, were created in the early Kamakura period. The audience was extended from the aristocracy to high ranking warriors and priests, who began to compose waka.
 By the 14th century, linked verse or renga superseded waka poetry in importance.

There are 30 National Treasures of 14 collections of waka and two works on waka style, compiled from between the 8th and the mid-13th century with most from the Heian period. The two works of waka theory are Wakatai jisshu (945) and Korai fūteishō (1197). The collections include the two first imperial waka anthologies: Kokinshū (905, ten treasures) and Gosen Wakashū (951); seven private anthologies: Man'yōshū (after 759, four treasures), Shinsō Hishō (1008), Nyūdō Udaijin-shū (before 1065), Sanjūrokunin Kashū (ca. 1112), Ruijū Koshū (before 1120), Shūi Gusō (1216), Myōe Shōnin Kashū (1248); and five utaawase contents: including one imaginary content (Kasen utaawase), the Konoe edition of the Poetry Match in Ten Scrolls (three treasures), Ruijū utaawase, the Poetry competition in 29 rounds at Hirota Shrine and the Record of Poetry Match in Fifteen Rounds. The designated manuscripts of these works found in this list date from the Heian and Kamakura periods.

Monogatari, Japanese-Chinese poetry, setsuwa
There are eleven National Treasures of seven works of Japanese prose and mixed Chinese-Japanese poetry compiled from between the early 9th and the first half of the 13th century. The manuscripts in this list date from between the early 10th to the second half of the 13th century. The three volume Nihon Ryōiki was compiled by the private priest Kyōkai around 822. It is the oldest collection of Japanese anecdotes or folk stories (setsuwa) which probably came out of an oral tradition. Combining Buddhism with local folk stories, this work demonstrates karmic causality and functioned as a handbook for preaching. Two out of four extant distinct but incomplete manuscripts have been designated as a National Treasures.

One of the earliest kana materials and one of the oldest extant works of Japanese prose fiction is the Tosa Diary written by Ki no Tsurayuki in 935. It is also the oldest Japanese travel diary, giving an account of a return journey to Kyoto after a four-year term as prefect of Tosa Province. The diary consists of close to 60 poems, connected by prose sections that detail the circumstances and the inspiration for the composition of the poems. The work has been valued as a model for composition in the Japanese style. The original manuscript by Ki no Tsurayuki had been stored at Rengeō-in palace library, and later was in the possession of Ashikaga Yoshimasa, after which its trace is lost. All surviving manuscripts of the Tosa Diary are copies of this Rengeō-in manuscript. The oldest extant of these, by Fujiwara no Teika, dates to 1235. One year later his son, Fujiwara no Tameie, produced another copy based on the original. Both transcriptions are complete facsimiles of the original, inclusive of the text, the layout, orthographical usages, and calligraphy. They have been designated as National Treasures.

The 984 Sanbō Ekotoba ("The three jewels" or "Tale of the three brothers" or "Notes on the pictures of the three jewels"), was written by Minamoto no Tamenori in Chinese for the amusement of a young tonsured princess. It is a collection of Buddhist tales and a guide to important Buddhist ceremonies and figures in Japanese Buddhist history. The designated manuscript from 1273 is known as the Tōji Kanchiin manuscript and is the second oldest of the Sanbō Ekotoba. It is virtually complete unlike the late Heian period (Tōdaiji-gire) which is a scattered assortment of fragments.

The cultural interaction between Japan and China is exemplified by the Wakan Rōeishū, a collection of 234 Chinese poems, 353 poems written in Chinese by Japanese poets (kanshi) and 216 waka, all arranged by topic. Compiled in the early 11th century by Fujiwara no Kintō, it was the first and most successful work of this genre. The English title, "Japanese-Chinese Recitation Collection" indicates that the poems in this collection were meant to be sung. The Wakan Rōeishū has been valued as a source for poetry recitation, waka composition and for its calligraphy, as it displayed kana and kanji. Three manuscripts of the Wakan Rōeishū written on decorated paper have been designated as National Treasures: the two scrolls at the Kyoto National Museum contain a complete transcription of the work and are a rare and fully developed example of calligraphy on an ashide-e ground; the Konoe edition at Yōmei Bunko is a beautiful example of karakami with five-colored design (saisen); and the Ōtagire is written on dyed paper decorated with gold drawings.

The Konjaku Monogatarishū from ca. 1120 is the most important setsuwa compilation. It is an anonymous collection of more than 1,000 anecdotes or tales. About two-thirds of the tales are Buddhist, telling about the spread of Buddhism from India via China to Japan. As such it is the first world history of Buddhism written in Japanese. This National Treasure is also known as the Suzuka Manuscript and consists of nine volumes covering setsuwa from India (vols. 2 and 5), China (vols. 7, 9, 10) and Japan (vols. 12, 17, 27, 29). It is considered to be the oldest extant manuscript of the Konjaku Monogatarishū and has served as a source for various later manuscripts.

A commentary on the Genji Monogatari by Fujiwara no Teika, known as Okuiri ("Inside Notes" or "Endnotes") has been designated as a National Treasure.
Written around 1233 it is the second oldest Genji commentary, supplementing the oldest commentary, the Genji Shaku from 1160.

History books and historical tales
The oldest known Japanese large-scale works are historical books (Kojiki and Nihon Shoki) or regional cultural and geographical records (fudoki) compiled on imperial order in the early 8th century. They were written with the aim of legitimizing the new centralized state under imperial rule by linking the origin of emperors to the Age of the Gods. The oldest of these historical books is the Kojiki ("Record of ancient matters") dating from 712 and composed by Ō no Yasumaro at the request of Empress Genmei. Written in ancient Japanese style using Chinese ideographs, it presents the mythological origin of Japan and historical events up to the year 628. Shortly after the completion of the Kojiki, the Nihon Shoki (or Nihongi) appeared in 720, probably originating to an order by Emperor Tenmu in 681. It is a much more detailed version of the Kojiki, dating events and providing alternative versions of myths; it covers the time up to 697. Compared to the Kojiki, it follows the model of Chinese dynastic histories more closely in style and language, using orthodox classical Chinese. Both of these works provide the historical and spiritual basis for shinto.

In 713, Empress Genmei ordered provincial governors to compile official reports on the history, geography and local folk customs. These provincial gazetteers are known as fudoki (lit. "Records of wind and earth") and provide valuable information about economic and ethnographic data, local culture and tales. Of more than 60 provincial records compiled in the early 8th century only five survived: one, the Izumo Fudoki (733), in complete form and four, Bungo (730s), Harima (circa 715), Hitachi (714–718) and Hizen (730s) as fragments. The Nihon Shoki is the first official history of Japan and the first of a set of six national histories (Rikkokushi) compiled over a 200-year period on Chinese models. Based on these six histories, Sugawara no Michizane arranged historical events chronologically and thematically in the Ruijū Kokushi which was completed in 892.

With the cessation of official missions to China and a general trend of turning away from Chinese-derived institutions and behavioral patterns in the latter part of the 9th century, the compilation of such national histories patterned on formal Chinese dynastic histories was abandoned. With the development of kana script, new styles of uniquely Japanese literature such as the monogatari appeared around that time. The newer style of historic writing that emerged during the Fujiwara regency, at the turning point of ancient imperial rule and the classical era, was called historic tale (rekishi monogatari) and became influenced by the fictional tale, especially by the Tale of Genji, with which it shared the scene-by-scene construction as fundamental difference to earlier historic writings. The oldest historical tale is the Eiga Monogatari ("A Tale of Flowering Fortunes"), giving a eulogistic chronological account of the Fujiwara from 946 to 1027, focusing particularly on Fujiwara no Michinaga. It was largely written by Akazome Emon, probably shortly after the death of Michinaga in 1027.

There are eleven National Treasures in the category of historical books including one manuscript of the Kojiki, five manuscripts of the Nihon Shoki, the Harima and Hizen Fudoki, two manuscripts of the Ruijū Kokushi and one of the Eiga Monogatari.
All of these treasures are later copies and with the exception of the Eiga Monogatari, the complete content of the works has to be assembled from several of these (and other) fragmentary manuscripts or be inferred from other sources. The Kojiki, long neglected by scholars until the 18th century, was not preserved as well as the Nihon Shoki which has been studied from soon after its compilation. While being the oldest text in this list, the extant manuscript dating to the 14th century is the earliest entry.

Others
There are 18 Japanese book National Treasures that do not belong to any of the above categories. They cover 14 works of various types, including biographies, law or rulebooks, temple records, music scores, a medical book and dictionaries. Two of the oldest works designated are biographies of the Asuka period regent Shōtoku Taishi. The Shitennō-ji Engi, alleged to have been an autobiography by Prince Shōtoku, described Shitennō-ji, and may have been created to promote the temple. The Shitennō-ji Engi National Treasure consists of two manuscripts: the alleged original discovered in 1007 at Shitennō-ji and a later transcription by Emperor Go-Daigo. Written by imperial order in the early 8th century, the Jōgū Shōtoku Hōō Teisetsu is the oldest extant biography of Shōtoku. It consists of a collection of anecdotes, legendary and miraculous in nature, which emphasize Shōtoku's Buddhist activities for the sake of imperial legitimacy, and stands at the beginning of Buddhist setsuwa literature. The oldest extant manuscript of the 803 Enryaku Kōtaishiki, a compendium of rules concerned with the change of provincial governors from 782 to 803, has been designated as a National Treasure.

The oldest extant Japanese lexica date to the early Heian period. Based on the Chinese Yupian, the Tenrei Banshō Meigi was compiled around 830 by Kūkai and is the oldest extant character dictionary made in Japan. The Hifuryaku is a massive Chinese dictionary in 1000 fascicles listing the usage of words and characters in more than 1500 texts of diverse genres. Compiled in 831 by Shigeno Sadanushi and others, it is the oldest extant Japanese proto-encyclopedia. There are two National Treasures of the Ishinpō, the oldest extant medical treatise of Japanese authorship compiled in 984 by Tanba Yasuyori. It is based on a large number of Chinese medical and pharmaceutical texts and contains knowledge about drug prescription, herbal lore, hygiene, acupuncture, moxibustion, alchemy and magic. The two associated treasures consist of the oldest extant (partial) and the oldest extant complete manuscript respectively.

Compiled between 905 and 927 by Tadahira, the Engishiki is the most respected legal compendium of the ritsuryō age and an important resource for the study of the Heian period court system. Emperor Daigo commanded its compilation; the Engishiki is according to David Lu an "invaluable" resource and "one of the greatest compilations of laws and precedents". The three designated National Treasures of the Engishiki represent the oldest extant manuscript (Kujō edition) and the oldest extant edition of certain date (Kongōji edition). Two National Treasure manuscripts are related to music: the oldest extant kagura song book (Kagura wagon hifu) from around the 10th century and the oldest extant Saibara score (Saibara fu) which is traditionally attributed to Prince Munetaka but based on the calligraphy it appears to date to the mid-11th century. The Hokuzanshō consists of writings by Fujiwara no Kintō on court customs and the function of the Daijō-kan. The designated Kyoto National Museum manuscript of the Hokuzanshō from about 1000 is noted for one of the few early extant examples of hiragana use and for the oldest extant letters in kana written on the reverse side of the scroll. Around the early 12th century a Shingon Buddhist priest compiled a dictionary with a large number of variant form characters known as Ruiju Myōgishō. The designated Kanchiin edition is the oldest extant complete manuscript of this work. Among the youngest items in this list are two temple records: the Omuro Sōjōki giving an account of priests of imperial lineage at Ninna-ji starting from the Kanpyō era, while the 1352 Tōhōki records treasures held at Tō-ji. Kōbō Daishi's biography in an original manuscript penned by Emperor Go-Uda in 1315 has been designated as a National Treasure.

See also
Nara Research Institute for Cultural Properties
Tokyo Research Institute for Cultural Properties
Independent Administrative Institution National Museum

Notes

References

Bibliography

Books, Japanese
Lists of books
Japanese literature
Japanese literature in Classical Chinese
Japanese poetry